Galloisiana nipponensis is a species of insect in the family Grylloblattidae that is endemic to Japan. Its type locality is Lake Chūzenji, Japan.

Range and habitat
It is found in montane habitats in central Honshu, including in the Taishaku Mountains (帝釈山脈) (near the Echigo Mountains).

Life cycle
Individuals live for at least five years.

References

Grylloblattidae
Insects of Japan
Endemic fauna of Japan